Blainvillia palpata is a species of ulidiid or picture-winged fly in the genus Blainvillia of the family Ulidiidae.

References

Ulidiidae